The Central Australian Aboriginal Media Association (CAAMA) is an organisation founded in 1980 to expose Aboriginal music and culture to the rest of Australia. It started with 8KIN-FM, the first Aboriginal radio station in the country. Based in Alice Springs, the organisation is particularly focused on the involvement of the local Indigenous community in its production. CAAMA is involved in radio, television and recorded music.

History

Origins and Imparja
In 1980, CAAMA originally established itself as a public radio station by two Aboriginal people and one "whitefella": Freda Glynn, Phillip Batty, and John Macumba. 8KIN-FM was the first Aboriginal radio station.

The success of the station quickly grew, leading its content to extend into music (country music and Aboriginal rock), call-ins, discussion, and news and current affairs. Broadcasts were made in six different languages, alongside English, and operated about fifteen hours every day. Later expansions saw the station move into AM and short-wave broadcasts with educational programmes, live recordings of Aboriginal bands, and commercials for local Aboriginal products and services. In 1984, CAAMA started to produce a video newsletter to circulate to those communities without easy access to radio facilities.

CAAMA obtained its Regional Commercial Television Services licence in 1986 after concern was raised that Australia’s first satellite (AUSSAT), which was set to bring commercial television to regional and remote sections of Australia, would have a detrimental impact on Aboriginal languages and cultures in Central Australia. CAAMA made a bid to obtain the licence being offered in 1985 via the Australian Broadcasting Tribunal Central Zone RCTS licence hearings process. CAAMA's bid was a symbolic act that was then taken seriously, as “the tribunal provided the arena for the articulation of national media policies at least nominally in support of the concerns of remote-living Aboriginal people”. In January 1988, the private commercial television station owned by CAAMA, Imparja, began broadcasting, servicing at least 100,000 viewers in Central Australia.

Imparja had contributed to a visible increase of Aboriginal identity in the Australian media landscape. The station was crucial in developing content which attempted to maintain and sustain Aboriginal culture. One example included Nganampa-Anwernekenbe [Ours], the first entirely Indigenous language television programme. sub-titled in English and produced in Australia, which reflected Aboriginal culture through storytelling and unique performing and visual arts content. There were also cleanliness and anti-alcohol community service advertisements which aimed to promote a healthier lifestyle in a culturally appropriate and effective manner. A series of films independently created films about, or created by, Aboriginal people were created in 1991.

During the first few years of Imparja, CAAMA faced growing concerns from media activists that commercial programming would consume local content (Michaels 1984). Other concerns were raised of the lack of Aboriginal presence in Imparja’s programming (Batty 1992) that, although Imparja was the largest television enterprise owned by Aboriginal people in Australia, only 10% its staff were Aboriginal (Ginsburg 1993); that some broadcasts reflected a lack of sufficient Aboriginal programming content; and others raised issues of broadcast quality. American anthropologist Faye Ginsburg suggested in 1993 that the establishment of CAAMA and the spread of communications technology could threaten the relationship between generations and the respect for traditional knowledge.>

However, the importance of CAAMA’s multimedia-based approach has ensured that Aboriginal media is an important part of the Australian media landscape, and to the social, cultural, and economic development of Aboriginal people in remote parts of Australia, as seen by CAAMA’s recent employment policies. Faye Ginsburg wrote in 1994:

21st century
In 2005 CAAMA submitted a report to the Standing Committee on Aboriginal and Torres Strait Islander Affairs’ inquiry into Indigenous employment. The report outlined several ways government leaders could access future policy in regards to Indigenous employment, using CAAMA as a case study. Some key issues CAAMA raised included: skills training; funding; recruitment; increase in Indigenous population; youth employment; strengthening links between education and training; establish and sustain networks between the private and public sectors, alongside the community; and collaborate with pre-existing organisations in training Aboriginal people.

The second section of the report outlined how CAAMA had contributed to the training and employment of Aboriginal people in Central Australia. In their 25 years of operations up until then, CAAMA had had an active "Aboriginalisation policy", which meaning that 65% of employees were Aboriginal.  CAAMA had also assisted in the education of over 100 Indigenous people, of whom a majority of their trainees were part of the Major Indigenous Employment Strategy (1988–1993). CAAMA suggested that their success has been afforded by the commitment of government; implementation of the Major Indigenous Employment Strategy; an understanding of social, cultural, and economic issues impacting Aboriginal people; and their flexible learning environment.

In 2009 CAAMA developed a business plan to identity ways to enhance their viability and sustainability with less reliance on government funding, and to increase new opportunities in New Media products and other related services and products.

In March 2020 CAAMA was put under special administration, after its debt level reached . In August 2021 the Registrar of Indigenous Corporations expected the organisation to be released from this administration and a new board appointed soon, after its stations, now operating seven communities, were up and running and making a profit again.

Services

CAAMA Radio
Established as 8KIN-FM in 1980-81, this was the first Aboriginal radio station in the country.

CAAMA Radio provides twenty-four hours Indigenous radio programming to over 600,000 people in Australia. It is the largest Aboriginal media organisation in the country since 1981, with the second largest audience reach in Australia. CAAMA broadcast through 12 Remote Aboriginal Communities Services (RIBS) and a mobile outside broadcasting truck, providing radio to several remote Aboriginal communities in over 30 different languages, including Papunya, Ntaria (Hermannsbug), Ltyentye Apurte (Santa Teresa), and Areyonga.

Film and television production

CAAMA Productions Pty Ltd is (was?) the largest Indigenous owned production house in Australia, with programming based on Indigenous cultures, lifestyle, and issues. Some of CAAMA's award-winning productions include:

 My Colour Your Kind (1998), a short film written and directed by Danielle Maclean which explores the journey of a young Aboriginal albino girl
 Cold Turkey (2003), a film written and directed by Steven McGregor, portraying the lives of brothers Shane and Robby and exploring the changing nature of their relationship
 Green Bush (2005), written and directed by Warwick Thornton,  is the story of local radio DJ Kenny and his audience - the local prison inmates
 Double Trouble (Australian TV series) (2007), the first Aboriginal-produced children's television show, which on Nine Network and the Disney Channel
 Samson and Delilah  (co-production with Scarlett Pictures), a drama feature film directed by Warwick Thornton and starring Rowan McNamara and Marissa Gibson, both young first time actors. The film competed at the 2009 Cannes Film Festival, winning the Caméra d'Or ('Gold Camera Award' for best first feature film) at the 2009 Cannes Film Festival. The film also won the Asia Pacific Screen Award for Best Film in 2009.

Music
CAAMA Music is a record label which produces 90% of its recordings in Indigenous languages. Performances organised by CAAMA have been popular with audiences, with people travelling from across the area to attend. One recent event, the Yeperenye Festival, drew a crowd of 30,000. Musicians like Gawurra and Alice Skye, who are recorded by CAAMA are also seen on the Imparja, SBS and ABC television networks. In conjunction with CAAMA Radio, CAAMA Music transmits outside broadcasts of performances by Aboriginal musicians.

Notable people
Successful CAAMA Indigenous trainees include Erica Glynn, who later became a mentor to a group of young filmmakers in the 1990s, including  Beck Cole, her cousin Danielle MacLean, Warwick Thornton, Steven McGregor, David Jowsey, and sound recordist/ director David Tranter.

Others who spent time at CAAMA include Rachel Perkins; Alan Collins (AFI award-winning cinematographer);  Priscilla Collins (executive producer, AFI nominee); Peter Clarke (online editor, Imparja Television); and Angela Bates (journalist, SBS Television).

See also

 History of broadcasting in Australia
Australian Aboriginal culture
Indigenous Australian music
Australian Indigenous Communications Association
Aboriginal Centre for the Performing Arts

Footnotes

References

Further reading
 PDF; or

 Wells, Julie. "Interview with Freda Glynn." Lilith (1986), Issue 3, pp 26–44

External links

Organisations serving Indigenous Australians
Indigenous Australian radio
Mass media companies established in 1980
Entertainment companies established in 1980
Organizations established in 1980
1980 establishments in Australia
Radio stations established in 1980